Lynn may refer to:

People and fictional characters
 Lynn (given name), including a list of people and fictional characters
 Lynn (surname)
 The Lynns, a 1990s American country music duo consisting of twin sisters Peggy and Patsy Lynn
 Lynn (voice actress), Japanese voice actress

Places

Canada
 Lynn Lake, Manitoba, a town and adjacent lake
 Lynn, Nova Scotia, a community
 Lynn River, Ontario

Ireland
 Lynn (civil parish), County Westmeath

United Kingdom
 King's Lynn is a seaport in Norfolk, England, about 98 miles north of London

United States
 Lynn, Alabama, a town
 Lynn, Arkansas, a town
 Lynn, Oakland, California, a former settlement
 Lynn, Indiana, a town
 Lynn, Massachusetts, a city
 Lynn (MBTA station)
 Lynn, Nebraska, an unincorporated community
 Lynn, Ohio, an unincorporated community
 Lynn, Susquehanna County, Pennsylvania, an historic community now part of Springville in Susquehanna County, Pennsylvania 
 Lynn, Utah, an unincorporated community
 Lynn, West Virginia, an unincorporated community
 Lynn, Wisconsin, a town
 Lynn (community), Wisconsin, an unincorporated community
 Lynn Canal, an inlet in Alaska
 Lynn County, Texas
 Lynn Township (disambiguation)

Other uses
 Lynn University, a private university in Boca Raton, Florida, United States
 Tropical Storm Lynn, name of multiple Pacific tropical cyclones

See also
 Alan of Lynn (c. 1348–c. 1423), English theologian
 Nicholas of Lynn, 14th century English astronomer
 Lyn (disambiguation)
 Lynne (disambiguation)
 Lin (disambiguation)
 Lynnville (disambiguation)